Yisrael Amir (– ) was the first commander of the Israeli Air Force.

Early life and biography
Amir was born into a Russian Jewish family with the surname Zabludovsky on 11 November 1902 in the city of Vilnius in the Russian Empire (now Lithuania). He made aliyah to the British Mandate of Palestine in 1923, where he joined the newly-formed Haganah, a paramilitary force of the Palestinian Jewish community known as the Yishuv.

Air Force career
The aftermath of the Israeli Declaration of Independence on 14 May 1948 saw the formation of the Israel Defense Forces, primarily from the ranks of the Haganah paramilitary force and the locally-drawn Jewish Brigade of the British Army. The aerial wing of the Haganah, known as the Sherut Avir, was reorganized as the Israeli Air Force, and Amir was appointed as its first commander by Israeli prime minister David Ben-Gurion on 16 May. Sherut Avir had until this point only operated a small collection of aged and non-military aircraft, and the procurement of modern military-grade aircraft posed a significant problem for the new air force; Amir immediately secured an order of several Messerschmitt Bf 109 fighters from Allied-occupied Germany and B-17 Flying Fortress bombers from the United States, which were ferried into Israel through Czechoslovakia. He retired from his military career in 1969, one year before the conclusion of the War of Attrition with Egypt. Amir died at a hospital in the city of Tel Aviv on 1 November 2002, aged 99.

References

 Obituary in Haaretz Google cache version

1902 births
2002 deaths
Israeli Air Force personnel
Israeli aviators
Israeli generals
Lithuanian emigrants to Mandatory Palestine
Israeli people of Lithuanian-Jewish descent
Lithuanian Jews
People from Vilna Governorate
Military personnel from Vilnius
Haganah members